Palaemon powelli is a species of shrimp of the family Palaemonidae. It was discovered in the Atlantic Ocean near West Africa.

References

Crustaceans described in 2009
Palaemonidae
Marine fauna of West Africa
Crustaceans of the Atlantic Ocean